Rolland Derenfro "Bay" Lawrence (born March 24, 1951) is a former professional American football cornerback who played his entire NFL career for the Atlanta Falcons from 1973 to 1980. He was selected All-Pro with the 1977 Grits Blitz defense, widely considered to be among the best in league history, and his 39 career interceptions are the most by a Falcons player.  Lawrence was selected to his one and only Pro Bowl in 1977, when he accounted for 10 turnovers on seven interceptions and three fumble recoveries.

Lawrence played college football for the Tabor Bluejays in Hillsboro, Kansas.   
He became a charter member of the Tabor College Hall of Fame in 1999 and was the first player to have his jersey number (3) retired by the school four years later.

References

1951 births
Living people
People from Franklin, Pennsylvania
Players of American football from Pennsylvania
American football cornerbacks
Atlanta Falcons players
National Conference Pro Bowl players
Tabor Bluejays football players